My Brothers' Crossing is a 2020 American drama film directed by Ricky Borba and starring Daniel Roebuck and James R. Black.  It is based on J.T. Clark's book In the Blink of an Eye.

Cast
Daniel Roebuck as J.T. Clark
James R. Black as C.J. Martin

Production
The film was shot in Franklin County, Virginia and Henry County, Virginia.

Release
The film was released on September 3, 2020.

References

External links
 
 

2020s English-language films